Cathedral Of Our Lady Of Fatima may refer to:

Portugal
Sanctuary of Fátima (Portuguese: Santuário de Fátima), also known (incorrectly) as the Basilica of Our Lady of Fátima

India
 Our Lady of Fatima Cathedral, Udaipur
 Cathedral of Our Lady of the Family Rosary of Fatima, Belgaum
 Our Lady of Fatima Cathedral, Hanamakonda

Other
 Cathedral of Our Lady of Fatima, Cairo in Egypt

See also
Our Lady of Fatima Church (disambiguation)